Henri Boério (born 13 June 1952) is a French former gymnast who competed in the 1972 Summer Olympics, in the 1976 Summer Olympics, and in the 1980 Summer Olympics. He was born in Sétif, French Algeria.

References

1952 births
Living people
Sportspeople from Sétif
French male artistic gymnasts
Olympic gymnasts of France
Gymnasts at the 1972 Summer Olympics
Gymnasts at the 1976 Summer Olympics
Gymnasts at the 1980 Summer Olympics
Olympic bronze medalists for France
Olympic medalists in gymnastics
Pieds-Noirs
Medalists at the 1976 Summer Olympics
20th-century French people
21st-century French people